Ife Central (Yoruba: Gbongan Ife) is a Local Government Area in Osun State, Nigeria. Its headquarters are in the city of Ile Ife to the south of the area.

It has an area of 111 km and a population of 167,254 at the 2006 census.

The postal code of the area is 220.

References

Local Government Areas in Osun State
Local Government Areas in Yorubaland